Tripetaloceroides is a genus of ground-hoppers (Orthoptera: Caelifera) in the subfamily Tripetalocerinae and tribe Tripetalocerini Bolívar, 1887 found in Asia.

The genus is considered as monotypic with the species Tripetaloceroides tonkinensis (originally as Tripetalocera tonkinensis Günther K, 1938) and can be found in Vietnam and southern China.

References

External links 
 

Tetrigidae
Caelifera genera
Orthoptera of Indo-China
Monotypic Orthoptera genera